Kdol Doun Teav is a sangkat of Krong Battambang (previously, khum/commune of Battambang District) in Battambang Province in north-western Cambodia.

Villages

 Chong Preaek
 Kdol
 Ou Ta Nob
 Ta Pruoch
 Ta Koy
 Kantuot
 Thkov

References

Communes of Battambang province
Battambang District